Providence Methodist Church, also known as Providence United Methodist Church, is a historic Methodist church located at Holly Hill, Orangeburg County, South Carolina, USA. It was designed by the architect Charles Coker Wilson and built in 1919–1920.  It consists of a sanctuary and rear educational/administrative wings in a modified cruciform plan. The front facade features a Neoclassical central tetrastyle portico with simplified Roman Doric order limestone columns, pilasters and entablature.  It also features large stained glass Palladian windows. Also on the property is the contributing church cemetery.

It was added to the National Register of Historic Places in 2009.

References

External links
Providence United Methodist Church website

United Methodist churches in South Carolina
Churches in Orangeburg County, South Carolina
Churches completed in 1920
20th-century Methodist church buildings in the United States
National Register of Historic Places in Orangeburg County, South Carolina
Churches on the National Register of Historic Places in South Carolina
Neoclassical architecture in South Carolina
Neoclassical church buildings in the United States